

Archibald Joyce (25 May 1873 – 22 March 1963) was an English light music composer and bandleader of the early 20th century. He is known for his popular short waltzes for dancing, such as Dreaming, Dream of Autumn and Vision of Salome. His waltzes were part of the White Star Line's orchestra repertoire, and likely played on the fatal maiden voyage of the Titanic.

Life
Joyce was born in London in May 1873 at 68 Winchester Street, Pimlico. His father was in the Grenadier Guards as a band sergeant. He showed his musical abilities early, singing in a church choir in Paddington and learning violin and piano.  His first known composition, completed at the age of 11, was a march that was performed several times by the conductor Dan Godfrey (in his pre-Bournemouth bandmaster days). He began his professional career as a pianist at London's Oxford Music Hall in the 1890s but soon also started playing for the ballet, most notably the company run by Katti Lanner at the Empire Theatre of Varieties in Leicester Square with Madame Genée as its leading ballerina.

Initially billing himself as Arthur Joyce he played on transatlantic liners, in music halls and in the theatre. In 1903 he was musical director of Mistress-of-the-Robes at the Royal Court Theatre and Opera House in Liverpool starring Ellen Terry. (He later toured with Terry, in 1909-1910). But he soon formed the Archibald Joyce Dance Orchestra, employing up to 100 players depending on the venue (which ranged from seaside pavilions to dance halls, great houses, aristocratic balls and 'coming out' dances during the London season) and its popularity quickly precluded other work. He began composing to expand the repertoire of his orchestra. 

The first originally composed waltz to attract any attention was Sweet Memories in 1908. The same year his waltz Dream of Autumn (Songe d'Automne in French), originally written for piano, became a best-seller. Vision of Salome (1909) also written for piano, followed a year later. 

Joyce has been credited as conducting  "the first modern dance band in Britain". Its fame extended to Europe and America. He recorded for the Gramophone Company HMV-label in London as early as 1912, and from the early 1920s his orchestras recorded material for the Aeolian Company's Vocalion Records label. The heyday of his band was in the pre-war and immediate post war periods, although he continued conducting and recording with his own ensembles throughout the 1920s and his music becoming a staple for dance-medley records as the gramophone industry evolved. But Joyce mostly didn't follow contemporaries such as Eric Coates, Albert Ketèlbey and Haydn Wood into the fields of light concert music for listening, or broadcasting and library music. His music remained primarily for dancing. The waltzes he composed stuck strictly to the form, with lots of repeated sections demanded by the dancers.

Although his style remained static across his entire career, Joyce kept composing into the 1940s and beyond, often for Oxford and Cambridge university balls. In 1942 he wrote the waltz Bohemia. Song of the River came out in 1946 and was broadcast by the BBC. His last published piece was Recruits on Parade, which appeared in 1951. 

Joyce married Florence Mary in 1919 and there was one adopted daughter, Maisie Parkinson. At the height of his fame he was living on Clapham Common in London. He moved to Bexhill-on-Sea in 1927, and then to Sutton in Surrey from 1932, at 75 Langley Park Road. He died there in 1963 at the age of 89, his life just overlapping with The Beatles.<ref name=mw>' Archibald Joyce, Orchestral Music. RTÉ Concert Orchestra/Andrew Penny, Naxos 8.555218, [https://www.musicwebinternational.com/2023/02/joyce-caravan-suite-naxos/ reviewed at MusicWeb International']'</ref> In the 1990s Philip Lane helped lead a revival of interest in Joyce with a radio documentary, The English Waltz King,Radio Times, Issue 3705, 21 January, 1995  also providing new arrangements of his music for a Marco Polo recording (re-issued on Naxos in 2022).

Works
The waltz Dreaming of 1911 was one of the first examples of the 'hesitation' waltz craze, and remained Joyce's most famous composition, selling one and a quarter million copies of the sheet music between 1911 and 1920. Many different recordings exist. Other highly successful walzes quickly followed, included Charming and Passing of Salome in 1912, 1000 Kisses, Always Gay and Maiden's Blush in 1913, Remembrance and Entrancing in 1914, and Love's Mystery in 1915.

His marches include The Palace Guard, Royal Standard, American March, Hiking to Brighton, Ceremonial March Britannica and Wedding Bells. The three movement suite of oriental miniatures Caravan was composed in 1926. Songs include I’m Skipper of a Submarine, God’s Greatest Gift, The Rogue of the Road, Awake, The Morning Light, Dreams of Bohemia, Friends Dear to Me and The Modern Girl. 

His music was taken up by other dance orchestras (Alfredo Campoli, Debroy Somers and others) and by amateur pianists. It also became familiar worldwide through its inclusion in musical revues and films. Dreaming was given lyrics by Earl Carroll and introduced in the US by Miss Kitty Gordon in Oliver Morosco's comedy with music, Pretty Mrs Smith (1913). In the US a conventional method of gaining public exposure for a song was to arrange to have it included in a revue: in this way Vision of Salome (1909) was included in Florenz Ziegfeld Jr.'s Follies of 1910. Songe d'Automne (aka Autumn Dream) and 1000 Kisses were incorporated into Charlie Chaplin's latter-day soundtrack added to his The Gold Rush in 1925. In 1948 film composer Benjamin Frankel included Dreaming as part of his score for Trottie True, evoking the Edwardian period in which the film is set. 

In 1916 Joyce co-wrote the musical Toto with Merlin Morgan (musical director of Daly's Theatre in London). After a try-out in Plymouth it opened at London's Duke of York's Theatre on 19 April. Despite good initial reviews it did not take off and was withdrawn after only 77 performances. A second foray into musical theatre came in 1921 with Gabrielle, co-written with George H. Clutsam, which successfully toured the provinces.

Although billed by his publishers (Ascherberg, Hopwood, and Crew) as "The English Waltz King", the implied comparison with Johann Strauss II is not valid, according to Jason Tomes. Instead Joyce was more directly inspired by Franz Lehár and Leo Fall, particularly by the waltz duet from the second act of Lehár's The Merry Widow, which opened at Daly's Theatre in London on 8 June 1907 and was extraordinarily popular, running for 778 performances. Joyce disliked jazz, avoiding the syncopation and saxophones favoured by the younger generation of dance hall composers. His ensemble was among the first generation of dance orchestras, soon to lose ground to brass and saxophone-dominated bands. Other contemporary examples of the English light waltz include Destiny by Sydney Baynes and Nights of Gladness by Charles Ancliffe, both 1912.Harold Atkins. 'Waltzing Through 50 Years', in The Daily Telegraph, 19 May 1966, p.16

Titanic
It is likely that passengers heard Joyce's compositions played during their time aboard RMS Titanic in April 1912. In fact, the White Star Line Songbook (which the orchestra members were required to memorize) contained several works by Joyce such as: Passing of Salome, A Thousand Kisses, Sweet Memories, Vision d'Amour, Love and Life in Holland, Vision of Salome, and Dream of Autumn. Harold Bride claimed the orchestra aboard Titanic played 'Autumn' as it sank. This has led to speculation that Bride was referring to Dream of Autumn'', which was part of the repertoire of the Songbook.

References

English composers
Light music composers
Romantic composers
1873 births
1963 deaths
 Dance band bandleaders